Reinhold Wendel (3 September 1910 – 1945) was a German racing cyclist. He rode in the 1937 Tour de France.

References

External links
 

1910 births
1945 deaths
German male cyclists
Place of birth missing
People from Lebach
Cyclists from Saarland
People from the Rhine Province